Andre Jones (born May 25, 1985) is an American football defensive back. He played college football at the University of Akron.

Early life
Born the son of Shannon Jones, Andre attended Forestville High School in Forestville, Maryland. After high school, Jones prepend at Avon Old Farms School.

College career
Jones continued his football career when he attended the University of Akron. He was named a starting safety in 2006 and 2007. His junior year, coach J. D. Brookhart moved Jones to wide receiver.

Professional career

Milwaukee Mustangs
Jones signed with the Milwaukee Mustangs of the Arena Football League in 2011. Jones had 12 interceptions his rookie year, earning him Second Team All-Arena honors.

San Jose SaberCats
In 2012, Jones played for the San Jose SaberCats.

San Antonio Talons
In 2013, Jones was assigned to the San Antonio Talons.

Los Angeles Kiss
On February 21, 2014, Jones was traded to the Los Angeles Kiss in exchange for Mark Crawford and Jeremy Lewis. He was released on May 6, 2014.

Pittsburgh Power
Jones was signed by the Pittsburgh Power on May 22, 2014. Jones played in 6 games for the Power, recording 13 tackles, 1 pass breakup and 1 interception. He also returned 10 kickoffs for 144 yards. The Power folded in November 2014.

Spokane Shock
On March 19, 2015, Jones was assigned to the Spokane Shock. Jones was placed on recallable reassignment on May 26, 2015.

Philadelphia Yellow Jackets
In 2016, Jones signed with the Philadelphia Yellow Jackets. He was released on May 24, 2016.

References

External links
 Akron Zips Bio

Living people
American football defensive backs
Akron Zips football players
Milwaukee Mustangs (2009–2012) players
San Jose SaberCats players
San Antonio Talons players
Los Angeles Kiss players
1985 births
Pittsburgh Power players
Spokane Shock players
Philadelphia Yellow Jackets players
Avon Old Farms alumni